Guy Vernon Lewis II (March 19, 1922 – November 26, 2015) was an American basketball player and coach.  He served as the head men's basketball coach at the University of Houston from 1956 to 1986.  Lewis led his Houston Cougars to five appearances in the Final Four of the NCAA tournament, in 1967, 1968, 1982, 1983, and 1984. His 1980s teams, nicknamed Phi Slama Jama for their slam dunks, were runners-up  for the national championship in back-to-back seasons in 1983 and 1984. He was inducted into National Collegiate Basketball Hall of Fame in 2007 and the Naismith Memorial Basketball Hall of Fame in 2013.

Coaching career
Born in Arp, Texas, Lewis was on the basketball and football teams of Arp High School. After serving in World War II, Lewis enrolled at the University of Houston on the GI Bill. He played center and forward on Houston's first varsity basketball team, graduating in 1947. In 1953, he returned to UH as an assistant coach, succeeding Alden Pasche as head coach in 1956. As a coach, he was known for championing the once-outlawed dunk, which he characterized as a "high percentage shot," and for clutching a brightly colored red-and-white polka dot towel on the bench during games.  Lewis was a major force in the racial integration of college athletics in the South during the 1960s, being one of the first major college coaches in the region to actively recruit African American athletes.  In 1964, his recruitment of the program's first African-American players, Elvin Hayes and Don Chaney, ushered in an era of tremendous success in Cougar basketball.  The dominant play of Hayes led the Cougars to two Final Fours during the 1960s and sent shock waves through Southern colleges that realized that they would have to begin recruiting black players if they wanted to compete with integrated teams.

Lewis led the Houston Cougars program to 27 straight winning seasons, 14 seasons with 20 or more wins, and 14 trips to the NCAA tournament. His Houston teams advanced to the Final Four on five occasions (1967, 1968, 1982, 1983, 1984) and twice advanced to the national championship game (1983, 1984). Standout players Lewis coached during his tenure at Houston included Hayes, Chaney, Akeem Olajuwon, Clyde Drexler, Otis Birdsong, Dwight Jones, Louis Dunbar, and Ken Spain.

Lewis's Houston teams played a key role in two watershed events that helped to popularize college basketball as a spectator sport. In January 1968, his underdog Cougars, led by Hayes, upset John Wooden's undefeated and top-ranked UCLA Bruins 71–69 in front of 52,693 fans at the Houston Astrodome.  This was the first nationally televised regular season college basketball game and subsequently became known as the "Game of the Century."  It marked a turning point in the emerging popularity of college basketball.  In the early 1980s, Lewis's Phi Slama Jama teams at UH gained notoriety for their fast-breaking, "above the rim" style of play as well as their overall success.  At the height of Phi Slama Jama's notoriety, they advanced all the way to the national championship game in 1983 and 1984, along the way notching consecutive 30-win seasons. In the first of those appearances, in 1983, the Cougars suffered a dramatic, last-second loss to underdog North Carolina State in the 1983 NCAA Final that became an iconic moment in the history of the sport, one that solidified the NCAA basketball tournament in the cultural firmament as March Madness.  Lewis's insistence that his teams play an acrobatic, up-tempo brand of basketball that emphasized dunking brought this style of play to the fore and helped popularize it amongst younger players.

The Cougars also lost in the 1984 NCAA Final to the Georgetown Hoyas led by Patrick Ewing.  Lewis retired from coaching in 1986 at number 20 in all-time NCAA Division I victories, his 592–279 record giving him a .680 career winning percentage.  In 1995, the University of Houston named the playing surface at Hofheinz Pavillion (now the Fertitta Center) "Guy V. Lewis Court" in Lewis' honor, making him a university namesake.

Later life and honors
Lewis was hospitalized for a stroke on February 27, 2002. He later recovered, but experienced some lasting effects from the episode. From 1959 until his death, Lewis resided in the University Oaks subdivision adjacent to the University of Houston. Lewis was the honoree at the 2012 Houston Aphasia Recovery Center luncheon benefit.

Lewis died on the morning of November 26, 2015 at a retirement facility in Kyle, Texas, at the age of 93.

Head coaching record

See also
 List of NCAA Division I men's basketball tournament Final Four appearances by coach

References

External links
 

1922 births
2015 deaths
American men's basketball coaches
American men's basketball players
Basketball coaches from Texas
Basketball players from Texas
Centers (basketball)
College men's basketball head coaches in the United States
Houston Cougars men's basketball coaches
Houston Cougars men's basketball players
Naismith Memorial Basketball Hall of Fame inductees
National Collegiate Basketball Hall of Fame inductees
People from Arp, Texas
Power forwards (basketball)
American military personnel of World War II